Jakob Albert Scherb (5 May 1839 – 18 September 1908) was a Swiss politician and President of the Swiss Council of States (1887).

External links 
 
 
 

1839 births
1908 deaths
Members of the Council of States (Switzerland)
Presidents of the Council of States (Switzerland)